2016 TaxSlayer Bowl can refer to:

 2016 TaxSlayer Bowl (January), played as part of the 2015–16 college football bowl season between the Georgia Bulldogs and the Penn State Nittany Lions
 2016 TaxSlayer Bowl (December), played as part of the 2016–17 college football bowl season between the Georgia Tech Yellow Jackets and the Kentucky Wildcats